Paraceraurus exsul is a species of trilobite that lived in St. Petersburg Region and Tver Region (in erratic blocks) of Russia, Estonia, Finland (Åland, in erratic blocks), Sweden, North Germany (in erratic blocks), Lithuania and Belarus during the Upper Llanvirnian Stage (463.5-460.9 Ma)  of the Middle Ordovician. They show a square front edge, large genal spines on the cheeks and characteristic long pygidial spines. Genal spines are curved usually inward and upward.

References

 Trilobites of the families Cheiruridae and Encrinuridae from Estonia. Geoloogia Instituudi Uurimused (Trud Inst Geol Acad Sci Est SSR) Tallinn, 3 1958: 165–205, 210–212. [Zoological Record Volume 95]
 V. Klikushin, A. Evdokimov, A. Pilipyuk. Ordovician Trilobites of the St. Petersburg Region, Russia. 2009.

External links
 Paleoart
 Fossil ID

Cheiruridae
Ordovician trilobites